Kot Najeebullah (Hindko:   (Shahmukhi)), also spelt Kot Najibullah, is one of the 44 union councils, administrative subdivisions, of Haripur District.

Kot Najibullah in Khyber Pakhtunkhwa is located in Pakistan about 18 mi (or 29 km) north-west of Islamabad, the country's capital town.

Kot Najibullah is the third largest town in district Haripur. It has a population of 50,000 people.

There are several Unesco world heritage sites nearby. The closest heritage site in Pakistan is Taxila in a distance of 11 mi (or 18 km), South.

See also
 Haripur
 Abbottabad
 Manshera
 Balakot
 Hattar

References

Union councils of Haripur District